The 2015 Rallye Deutschland was a motor racing event for rally cars that was held over four days between 20 and 23 August 2015. It marked the 33rd running of the Rallye Deutschland, and was the ninth round of the 2015 season for the World Rally Championship, WRC-2, WRC-3 championships, as well as the third round of the FIA R-GT Cup.

Entry list

Results 
Defending champion Sébastien Ogier won the rally by 23 seconds ahead of his Volkswagen Motorsport teammate Jari-Matti Latvala, to extend his championship lead to 93 points. The podium was completed by another Volkswagen driver, Andreas Mikkelsen. In the supporting classes, Jan Kopecký won in WRC-2, Andrea Crugnola took the WRC-3 honours while the FIA R-GT Cup class was won by Romain Dumas.

Overall standings

Stage times

Power Stage

References

External links

Deutschland
Rallye Deutschland
Rally